Marble Point is a rocky promontory on the coast of Victoria Land, Antarctica. The United States operates a station at the point. The outpost is used as a helicopter refueling station supporting scientific research in the nearby continental interior, such as the McMurdo Dry Valleys. Dependent upon the weather conditions at the time, helicopters are able to fly in and out of the station 24 hours a day during the summer research season.

The station's remote location and adjoining frozen sea have largely discouraged tourism in the area. However, the Russian icebreaker  conducts cruises in the Ross Sea and McMurdo Sound. In 1993, the icebreaker docked at fast ice offshore Marble Point. Tourists aboard helicopters launched from the icebreaker flew excursions into the McMurdo Dry Valleys.

History
United States military forces built the camp on the western shores of McMurdo Sound in 1956 in conjunction with the forthcoming 1957–58 International Geophysical Year (IGY).

Preparation for IGY included constructing a hard-surface air strip at Marble Point. A VX-6 Otter airplane made Antarctica’s first wheels-on-dirt landing at Marble Point in 1957. Aboard were U.S. Navy Admiral Dufeck and New Zealand explorer Sir Edmund Hillary.  A de Havilland Canada DHC-3 Otter aircraft crashed on take off at Marble Point, on January 04, 1959, taking the lives of two men. The plane was part of Operation Deep Freeze IV.

Contemporary Marble Point is staffed during the austral summer by a station manager, cook, and a "fuelie," a person who fuels helicopters (typically AStar and Bell 212's contracted by the United States Antarctic Program and Antarctica New Zealand, owned and operated by Petroleum Helicopters International). Hot meals and minimal overnight accommodations for 14 are available for pilots and personnel traveling to and from inland research operations.

Personnel rely upon melted snow for potable water. A bulldozer is used to scoop snow from nearby Wilson Piedmont Glacier. The snow is dumped into a hopper for melting and subsequent filtration. Other facilities at the station include an automated weather station.

United States Antarctic Program workers conducted a concerted cleanup at the station during the 1989–1990 and 1990–1991 summer research seasons. Fuel spills are known to have occurred in the area. As late as 2001, spills more than 40 years old were still visible. Contemporary operations include the collection of human waste at the station, which is collected and transported to McMurdo Station.

Re-supply
Each austral summer, a United States Coast Guard icebreaker busts a ship channel to Marble Point in order to deliver helicopter fuel. Fuel is then pumped ashore. Formerly, personnel pumped the aviation fuel into 20,000 gallon bladders for storage. However, the fuel bladders were replaced with steel tanks. Contaminated soil is present at Marble Point from fuel spills which occurred between 1957 and 1963.

Support personnel re-supply the camp annually via a convoy of over-the-ice vehicles from McMurdo Station. Drivers maneuver 15-ton Delta cargo vehicles equipped with large balloon-type tires over a more than 50-mile ice road. Alternatively, vehicles towing snow sleds are used to transport cargo. Drivers also deliver food, construction equipment, and scientific equipment that is staged at Marble Point for subsequent airlift to field camps.

Flags placed approximately every quarter mile mark much of the ice road to Marble Point. Drivers carry global positioning devices as navigational aids during the seven-hour journey. Waste materials (including human waste) from Marble Point and garbage dropped off from inland research stations are back-loaded to McMurdo Station for disposal. The supply season runs from mid-October to late November or early December.

See also
List of airports in Antarctica
List of field camps
McMurdo Dry Valleys
McMurdo Sound
Operation Deep Freeze
South Stream
Victoria Land
Williams Field

Gallery

References

External links
The Antarctic Sun
Marble Point - personal website
Marble Point - field camp tour video
THE "UNOFFICIAL" VXE-6 WEBPAGE for the (late-RIP) US Navy Squadron
United States National Oceanic and Atmospheric Administration Photo Library
United States Department of Agriculture.

Headlands of Victoria Land
Outposts of Antarctica
1956 establishments in Antarctica